This is a list of Dutch television related events from 1989.

Events
10 March - Justine Pelmelay is selected to represent Netherlands at the 1989 Eurovision Song Contest with her song "Blijf zoals je bent". She is selected to be the thirty-third Dutch Eurovision entry during Nationaal Songfestival held at RAI Congresgebouw in Amsterdam.
Unknown - Carina Bos, performing as Timi Yuro wins the fifth series of Soundmixshow. This was the last series to be broadcast on KRO.

Debuts

International
6 October –  Count Duckula
24 December – / Alfred J. Kwak (VARA)

Television shows

1950s
NOS Journaal (1956–present)

1970s
Sesamstraat (1976–present)

1980s
Jeugdjournaal (1981–present)
Soundmixshow (1985-2002)
Het Klokhuis (1988–present)

Ending this year

Births
9 April - Monique Smit, singer & TV presenter

Deaths